Felicia Ferrone is an American industrial and furniture designer who lives and works in Chicago, Illinois, United States.

Early life and education
Born in Chicago, Felicia Ferrone graduated with a degree in architecture from Miami University, Ohio, after which she moved to Milan. Ferrone’s expansive reach is informed by her early experience as an architect in Milan, where she was first taught to “blur boundaries.” In a series of positions with some of Italy’s most notable design luminaries, among them Antonio Citterio and Piero Lissoni, she developed her belief that all aspects of design are interdependent, that nothing exists in a vacuum but always in relation to the environment, objects, and systems that surround it.

Career
Ferrone's award winning work is included in the Art Institute of Chicago permanent collection, is a recipient of a GOOD DESIGN Award, and her work is widely exhibited and published internationally. She is a Clinical Assistant Professor at the University of Illinois at Chicago and was an Instructor at the School of the Art Institute of Chicago for many years. Producing and distributing her own work under her brand, fferrone, she also does commissioned work for clients, of which Boffi, Volume Gallery, and Covo among others.

The international namesake brand fferrone design, based in Chicago, is known for delivering the unexpected through a seemingly simple gesture. Archetypes are reinvented; typologies are crossed and blended. European influences, minimalist aesthetics, mastery of proportion, and meticulously considered details are the hallmarks of fferrone. Often lighthearted and whimsical, the furniture and objects are timeless. Through close collaborations with master artisans, each piece is handcrafted allowing for innovative use of materials and production techniques, underlying another fundamental attribute to her design philosophy and approach.

In 2019, Felicia Ferrone was honored to be represented among these pioneering and talented women in design in The Study by 1stdibs, "10 Trailblazing Female Designers."  Together with: Florence Knoll, Zaha Hadid, Charlotte Perriand, Eileen Gray, Greta Magnusson-Grossman, Bec Brittain, Anna Karlin, Nika Zupanc, Nada Debs and Felicia Ferrone.

She was also N. 13 in "Design 50: Who Shapes Chicago 2019" in New City Magazine

Exhibitions
 The Space in Between at Pavilion, Chicago 2015
 Americans in Paris, The Mona Bismarck Centre, Paris 2014
 CHGO DSGN at the Chicago Cultural Center, Chicago 2014
 America Made Me, London Design Week 2012
 The Art Institute of Chicago's Permanent Collection of Architecture and Design
 On Space at Volume Gallery, Chicago 2010

Awards
 Best Furniture Collection awarded by ASID at the International Contemporary Furniture Fair, New York May 2014
 Best Collection at NY NOW Gift Show, New York August 2014
 GOOD DESIGN AWARD for the Revolution Wine and Water, Chicago Athenaeum 2004

References

Living people
Product designers
American industrial designers
American furniture designers
Year of birth missing (living people)